Gildas Morvan (born: 31 July 1968) is a sailor from France. who represented his country at the 1996 Summer Olympics in Savannah, United States as crew member in the Soling. With helmsman Marc Bouet and fellow crew member Sylvain Chtounder they took the 11th place.

References

Living people
1968 births
Sailors at the 1996 Summer Olympics – Soling
Olympic sailors of France
Sportspeople from Pretoria
French male sailors (sport)